Jue Quon Tai (December 21, 1898 - September 24, 1991) was a Chinese-American vaudeville performer.

She was born in California on December 21, 1896 or December 21, 1898 and sometimes used the Americanized name Rose Eleanor Jue or Rose Eleanor Jewel. Her mother was Bertha "Bertie" Eng Jue (1876-1955) and her father was Jue Sue a prominent figure in Portland's Chinatown.  Her younger sister, So Tai Jue (November 18, 1899 - August 5, 1998) was also a vaudeville performer.  So Tai Jue, also called Alice Jue or Alice Jewell, was known as the "voice of the orient".  Jue Quon Tai also had two brothers, Charles and Herbert Jue, and an older sister, Leona Mary Jue. 

She worked in vaudeville in Portland, Oregon and at the Orpheum Theatre in San Francisco.  She began performing at the Pantages Theatre in April 1915, receiving positive reviews.  She attended the Panama–Pacific International Exposition later that year and then went to New York City.

She performed in Silks and Satins on Broadway from July 15, 1920 to September 4, 1920.  She was billed as performing at the New York Hippodrome in 1925.  

In 1927 she married Harry Lachman. Her husband died in 1975.

She died on September 24, 1991 under the name "Quon T. Lachman" and "Quon Tai Lachman" in Beverly Hills, California.

References

External links

Jue Quon Tai at IMDb

1890s births
1991 deaths
American actresses
Chinese emigrants to the United States
20th-century American women
20th-century American people